The Shaggy Dog is a 1959 American comedy film produced by Walt Disney Productions and loosely based on the 1923 novel The Hound of Florence by Felix Salten. Directed by Charles Barton from a screenplay by Lillie Hayward and Bill Walsh, the film stars Fred MacMurray, Tommy Kirk, Jean Hagen, Kevin Corcoran, Tim Considine, Roberta Shore, and Annette Funicello. The film follows a teenage boy named Wilby Daniels who, by the power of an enchanted ring of the Borgias, is transformed into a shaggy Old English Sheepdog.

The film was released on March 19, 1959, and grossed over $9 million during its initial release, making it the second-highest-grossing film of 1959. A sequel, The Shaggy D.A. (1976), starred Dean Jones, Tim Conway, and Suzanne Pleshette. It was followed by a 1987 television sequel, a 1994 television remake and a 2006 theatrical remake.

Plot 
Wilbur "Wilby" Daniels is a boy who is misunderstood by his father, Wilson. Wilson thinks Wilby is crazy half the time because of his elder son's often dangerous inventions. As a retired mailman who often ran afoul of canines, he has a hatred of dogs, and he simply cannot understand why his younger son, Montgomery ("Moochie"), would want a dog.

Wilby and his rival Buzz Miller go with a French girl named Francesca Andrassé to the local museum. Wilby gets separated from the other two, who leave without him. Wilby encounters former acquaintance Professor Plumcutt (whose newspaper Wilby used to deliver), who tells him all about mystical ancient beliefs, including the legend of the Borgia family, who used shape-shifting as a weapon against their enemies.

On the way out, Wilby collides with a table that holds a display case of jewelry. He accidentally ends up with one of the rings in the cuff of his pants. It is the cursed Borgia ring, and no sooner does he read the inscription on it ("In canis corpore transmuto, which, unknown to Wilby, means, "Into a dog's body I change") then he transforms into the Shaggy Dog, named Chiffon, who is Francesca's shaggy "Bratislavian sheepdog", a.k.a Old English Sheepdog. Confused, Wilby, as a dog, goes to Professor Plumcutt, who says Wilby has invoked the Borgia curse upon himself, which can only be broken through a heroic act of selflessness. After getting chased out of his own house by his enraged father, who fails to recognize him as a dog, Wilby has a series of misadventures while switching back and forth between human form and dog form. Only Moochie and Professor Plumcutt know his true identity, as Wilby has spoken to them both in dog form. While at a local dance in his human form, he accidentally transforms himself into a dog.

Francesca sees that Chiffon has been acting strangely, and she asks her adoptive father, Dr. Valasky, to watch over Chiffon for the night. As she exits, a secretive associate of Dr. Valasky named Thurm enters. Wilby, as a dog, overhears Thurm and Dr. Valasky discuss plans to steal a government secret.

The next day, Wilby, as a dog, tells Moochie about the spies. Wilby reveals the secret to his dumbfounded father. As Wilby and Moochie discuss what to do next, Francesca's butler Stefano comes out and drags Wilby into the house. Moochie runs to his father to get help, who goes to the authorities, until Wilson suddenly finds himself accused of being either crazy or a spy.

Stefano and Francesca's adoptive father, Dr. Valasky, are discussing plans to steal a government secret, and Wilby, as a dog, overhears. Unfortunately for him, he transforms into human Wilby right in front of the spies and has been discovered, but not before he hears Dr. Valasky expressing his wish to get rid of his own daughter.

The spies angrily capture Wilby and force Francesca to leave with them, leaving the human Wilby bound and gagged in the closet at once. Fortunately, Moochie sneaks into the house just after Dr. Valasky, Stefano and Francesca leave, and discovers Wilby, who is transformed into a dog, still bound and gagged in the closet.

When Buzz appears at the Valasky residence to take Francesca on a date, Wilby, still in his dog form, steals Buzz's hot rod automobile. Buzz reports this to Officers Hansen and Kelly, who are in disbelief until they see the shaggy dog driving Buzz's hot rod. Wilson and Moochie follow Buzz and the police, who end up chasing everyone. The spies attempt to leave aboard a boat, but the police call in the harbor patrol to apprehend Dr. Valasky and stop his boat. Wilby, in his dog form, swims up and wrestles with the men, as Francesca gets knocked out of the boat. He then saves her life and drags her ashore, which finally breaks the curse of dog form. When Francesca regains her consciousness, Buzz tries to take credit for saving her. This angers Wilby, who is still a dog, so much that he attacks Buzz. Seconds later, Buzz is surprised to find himself wrestling with the real human Wilby, and the real Chiffon reappears. Since Chiffon is soaking wet, Francesca concludes that he has really saved her from the ocean and she hugs and praises him.

Now that Wilson and Chiffon are declared heroes, Francesca is able to leave for Paris without her evil adoptive father and former butler, both of whom have been arrested for espionage and she gives Chiffon to the Daniels family for them to keep as her way of thanking them. Since Wilson has gotten such commendation for foiling a spy ring because of "his love of dogs", he has a change of heart over his hatred of dogs, a promise to change his ways, and a sense of humor, while he also realizes that his dog-hating attitude isn't really good anymore, so he allows Moochie to care for Chiffon, as he wanted a dog all along. Wilby and Buzz decide to forget their rivalry over Francesca and resume their friendship instead.

Cast

Production

Development
Walt Disney had previously bought the rights to Felix Salten's 1923 novel Bambi, a Life in the Woods and produced an adaptation of it in 1942 under his animation department. Prior to that film's release, Walt Disney bought the rights to five more Salten novels in May 1941, as well as options to have him adapt them. The novels were Bambi's Children, Perri, Renni, City Jungle, and The Hound of Florence. He did not want to make Bambi's Children but did not want anyone else to make it, but he intended to make the other films as cartoons. Salten was then living in Switzerland and was paid out of funds owing to Disney's then-distributor RKO Radio Pictures which had been "frozen" in that country; this would be credited against money RKO owed Disney for distributing his films. Salten died in Zurich in 1945.

In June 1955, when Disney was making Lady and the Tramp, he said he still had no plans to film The Hound of Florence. However, ABC wanted Disney to make another TV series, and he pitched them The Shaggy Dog, "a story that treated the younger generation and its problems in a light manner. They turned me down flat. I was hopping mad when I went back to the studio, so I called in Bill Walsh and said 'Let's make a feature of it'". Star Tommy Kirk later claimed the film was meant to be a two-part television show and "only at the very last minute did they decide to splice them together and release them as a film".

In the late 1950s, the idea of an adult human turning into a beast was nothing new, but the idea of a teenager doing just that in a movie was considered avant-garde and even shocking in 1957 when American International Pictures released their horror film, I Was a Teenage Werewolf, one of the studio's biggest hits. The Shaggy Dog betrays its successful forebear with Fred MacMurray's classic bit of dialogue: "That's ridiculous—my son is not a werewolf! He's nothing more than just a big, baggy, stupid-looking shaggy dog!"

The director was Charles Barton, who also directed Spin and Marty for The Mickey Mouse Club. Veteran screenwriter Lillie Hayward also worked on the Spin and Marty serials, which featured several of the same young actors as The Shaggy Dog. Disney producer Bill Walsh mused that "The Shaggy Dog" was the direct inspiration for the TV show My Three Sons, and Walsh said "Same  kids, same dog and Fred MacMurray!"

Casting
The lead role went to Tommy Kirk, who had started with Disney in a Hardy Boys serial for The Mickey Mouse Club alongside Tim Considine. Considine also played a role, as did Annette Funicello who had been the most popular member of The Mickey Mouse Club. It was Funicello's first film.

It took several months for Disney to find the right dog.

Kirk later said: "At the time, I viewed it as a fairy tale, but in later years, I've come to think that the film has one of the screwiest combinations of plot elements in any movie ever made. It has all the realistic elements of the Cold War -- Russian spies plotting against the government -- mixed in with a rivalry over Annette between two teenage boys, mixed in with a fantasy about a boy who turns into a dog because he encounters a ring from the Borgias!"

Filming
Filming started August 4, 1958.
 Disney later recalled that "nobody — not even on the lot — paid any attention to us. We made the picture for one and a quarter million dollars while the rest of the town was turning out super dupers".

Tim Considine was clawed in the eye by the sheepdog during filming.

Dialogue would be written to match the mouth movements of the dog. If the dog did not move its mouth, beef jerky was used.

Kirk said he had "beautiful memories of" Barton, "as he was a very gentle, nice person with a good sense of humor". He also enjoyed working with MacMurray:
I thought he was a great actor. I liked him enormously. I tried to get to know him, and got to know him a little bit, but he did have a kind of wall that I never got around. He was distant, he was conservative, and kind of remote. He didn't go out and have lunch. Instead, he had a tiny can of Metrecal — a horrible diet drink. There were stories about him being cheap, and I heard that he was worth $500 million at the time of his death. But I just loved him. They say he was Walt Disney's favorite actor, and I can understand that. He ranks up there with Cary Grant as one of the great light comics.
Veteran Disney voice actor Paul Frees had a rare on-screen appearance in the film — for which he received no on-screen credit — as Dr. J.W. Galvin, a psychiatrist who examines Wilby's father (MacMurray), Wilson Daniels. Frees also did his usual voice acting by also playing the part of the narrator who informs the audience that Wilson Daniels is a "man noted for the fact that he is allergic to dogs".

Reception
The Shaggy Dog was the second-highest-grossing film of 1959 and was Disney's most financially successful film of the 1950s. During its initial release, the film grossed $9.6 million in domestic theatrical rentals on a budget of less than $1 million, making it more profitable than the year's highest-grossing film, Ben-Hur. The Shaggy Dog also performed very strongly on a 1967 re-release. The film was the most profitable film made by Disney at that time.

According to Diabolique, "the movie kicked off a whole bunch of comedies with a slight fantastical element that powered Disney film division for the next two decades. Much of the credit went to MacMurray; a lot of the credit should have gone to Kirk, whose easy-going boy next door charm made him the ideal American teen".

On review aggregator Rotten Tomatoes, the film holds a 68% approval rating with an average rating of 5.8/10, based on 19 reviews. On Metacritic, the film has a weighted average score of 45 out of 100 based on 6 critics, indicating "mixed or average reviews".

Novelization
While the movie is based on Salten's The Hound of Florence, a novelization of the movie published by Scholastic eight years later in 1967 made some interesting changes to the plot. First, Funicello's character Allison was removed entirely, and her name is not listed among the movie's principal performers.  As a result, the rivalry between Wilby and Buzz is greatly reduced. Also, Dr. Valasky is changed into Francesca's uncle, not her adoptive father.

A comic book adaptation also appeared from Western Publishing, which followed the movie's storyline more closely. This was reprinted in 1978 as a companion story to an adaptation of The Cat from Outer Space.

Legacy
The Shaggy Dog was at that time the most profitable film produced by Walt Disney Productions, which influenced the studio's follow-up live-action film production. Using a formula of placing supernatural and/or fantastical forces within everyday mid-twentieth century American life, the studio created a series of "gimmick comedies" (a term used by Disney historian and film critic Leonard Maltin) with action to keep children entertained and some light satire to amuse the adult audience. Using television actors on their summer hiatus who were familiar to audiences but did not necessarily have enough clout to receive over-the-title billing (or a large fee) from another major studio was one way these comedies were produced inexpensively, they also tended to use the same sets from the Disney backlot repeatedly. This allowed Walt Disney Productions a low-risk scenario for production, any of these films could easily make back their investment just from moderate matinee attendance in neighborhood theatres, and they could also be packaged on the successful Disney anthology television series The Wonderful World of Disney.

The popular television series My Three Sons (1960–1972) reunited MacMurray and Considine, and also features a pet shaggy sheepdog named "Tramp".

Sequels
 The film was followed in 1976 with a theatrical sequel, The Shaggy D.A., starring Dean Jones as a 45-year-old Wilby Daniels. 
 In 1987, a two-part television movie set somewhere in the 17 years between the events portrayed in The Shaggy Dog and The Shaggy D.A., entitled The Return of the Shaggy Dog, presented a post–Saturday Night Live Gary Kroeger as a 30-something Wilby Daniels.

Remakes
 In 1994, the first remake of the film was a television movie, with Disney regular Scott Weinger as a teenaged Wilbert "Wilby" Joseph Daniels, and Ed Begley Jr. playing a part similar to the one originated by Fred MacMurray in 1959.
 In 2006, Disney released a live-action remake of the film with Tim Allen as a 50-something Dave Douglas. This film has an entirely different story, characters, and transformation plot device unrelated to the original trilogy. To tie-in with the theatrical release of the 2006 remake, the original 1959 movie was re-issued in the United States as a special DVD labeled The Wild & Woolly Edition, which featured the movie in two forms: one in the original black and white, the other a colorized version. The colorized version however is not restored and suffers from age. In the UK, the 1959 movie has only ever been made available on DVD in black and white. The 2006 remake and Tim Allen's performance was poorly received by critics, with a moderately successful box office return.

See also
 The Shaggy D.A., the 1976 theatrical sequel
 The Return of the Shaggy Dog, the 1987 television sequel
 The Shaggy Dog, the 2006 Disney live-action remake of the 1959 live-action film
 Felix Salten, the author of The Hound of Florence, the source material for the 1959 live-action film

References 
Notes

Bibliography

Further reading

External links
  
 
 
 
 UltimateDisney.com: The Shaggy Dog (1959) DVD Review
 Review of film at Variety

1950s fantasy comedy films
1959 films
American black-and-white films
American fantasy comedy films
Anthropomorphic dogs
1950s children's fantasy films
1950s English-language films
Films scored by Paul Smith (film and television composer)
Films adapted into comics
Films about dogs
Films about shapeshifting
Films based on Austrian novels
Films directed by Charles Barton
The Shaggy Dog films
Walt Disney Pictures films
1959 comedy films
Films about father–son relationships
1950s American films